Thomas Holst (born February 18, 1964) is a German serial killer who became known as the Heidemörder.

Events 
Between 1987 and 1989, Holst raped, tortured and dismembered three women in the south of Hamburg. A psychiatric report described Holst as "untreatable and with extreme relapse probability."

On September 27, 1995, his former therapist Tamar Segal helped him escape from the high-security wing of Klinikum Nord's forensic science of the former LBK Hamburg in Langenhorn. The police search was initially inconclusive, but suspicion arose against Segal. After this escape assistant had been arrested three months after the escape, Holst surrendered himself on December 30, 1995 at the Police Station 31 in Hamburg's Uhlenhorst.

On March 13, 1997, Holst and Segal got married in the Hamburg Detention Center. In 2003, the district court of Hamburg dismissed Holst's claim to the consummation to Segal. It was about involuntary treatment, to meet regularly without observation with his wife in a visitor's room of the hospital north. The hospital refused this, pointing to the danger to his wife's life and threatened with risk of absconding. Holst appealed against the judicial relief, but it was unsuccessful.

Victims 
 Andrea Grube-Nagel (killed November 25, 1987): The 21-year-old student was forced on the way from the Rissen train station to her parents' house into Holst's car when he threatened her with a knife. Her body was  found two days later in Kaltenkirchen.
 Petra Maaßen (killed February 11, 1988): The 28-year-old Rahlstedt housewife was forced leaving a restaurant 400 metres away from her home, when Holst threatened her with a knife and forced her into his car. Maaßen's mutilated corpse was found a day later in a field in Bargfeld-Stegen.
 Lara Holz (killed November 27, 1989): The 22-year-old cosmetic student climbed into Holst's car after she had missed her bus. Holst had noticed this and then offered her a ride. Her remains were found five days later in Luheheide.

See also
 List of German serial killers

References 

1964 births
1987 murders in Germany
1988 murders in Germany
1989 murders in Germany
Criminals from Hamburg
German rapists
German serial killers
Living people
Male serial killers